In enzymology, a 17α-hydroxyprogesterone aldolase is an enzyme that catalyzes the chemical reaction

17α-hydroxyprogesterone  androst-4-en-3,17-dione + acetaldehyde

Hence, this enzyme has one substrate, 17α-hydroxyprogesterone, and two products, androst-4-en-3,17-dione and acetaldehyde.

This enzyme belongs to the family of lyases, specifically the aldehyde-lyases, which cleave carbon-carbon bonds. The systematic name of this enzyme class is 17α-hydroxyprogesterone acetaldehyde-lyase (4-androstene-3,17-dione-forming). Other names in common use include C-17/C-20-lyase, and 17α-hydroxyprogesterone acetaldehyde-lyase. This enzyme participates in androgen and estrogen metabolism.

References

 

EC 4.1.2
Enzymes of unknown structure